Madjid Bougherra (born 7 October 1982) is an Algerian football manager and former player who played as a centre-back. He is the manager of the Algeria A' national team.

Bougherra began his professional career with French club Gueugnon before having spells with Crewe Alexandra, Sheffield Wednesday and Charlton Athletic in England. He moved to Rangers in 2008 for a fee of £2.5 million and made 113 appearances; he was a key part of the team that won the Scottish Premier League championship in the 2008–09, 2009–10 and 2010–11 seasons. He signed for Lekhwiya of Qatar in 2011 for £1.7 million, moving to Al-Fujairah three years later. Bougherra ended his club career following a short spell at Football League Greece club Aris.

Born in France, Bougherra won 70 international caps and scored four goals for the Algeria national team from 2004 to 2015. He participated in the 2010 Africa Cup of Nations, where Algeria finished fourth, and the 2010 FIFA World Cup. He served as the team's captain for the 2014 FIFA World Cup.

Club career

Early life and career
Bougherra was born and raised in Dijon, Côte-d'Or in eastern France. He began his career at AS Quetigny in 1999.

Gueugnon
Bougherra joined Gueugnon in July 2002. Whilst with the Ligue 2 club, Bougherra made 49 league appearances and scored one goal. He also made a single appearance in the Coupe de la Ligue.

Crewe Alexandra
Bougherra joined English Championship club Crewe Alexandra on loan at the end of January 2006. He managed to get into the Crewe record books as his agent, Charles Collymore recommended the Algerian defender to the South Cheshire club and was given £5,000 by the club, making him the first agent to receive a fee from Crewe.

After a number of impressive performances, including a goal in the 4–1 win over Coventry City, many of the club's supporters urged then manager Dario Gradi to sign Bougherra on a permanent basis. However, in April 2006, he confirmed he would leave Crewe at the end of his loan spell after failing to help the club avoid relegation to League One.

Sheffield Wednesday

Bougherra's performances at Crewe had attracted interest from a number of clubs in England, including some from the Premier League. He signed for another Championship club, Sheffield Wednesday, in May 2006. The fee was undisclosed, but according to manager Paul Sturrock it was not as much as the reported £300,000. Bougherra made a big impact at Hillsborough after making his debut on 5 August against Preston North End, winning the Player of the Month award in only his second month at the club and captaining the team for the first time against Queens Park Rangers at home in October. He also scored twice for Wednesday, against Ipswich Town and West Bromwich Albion in the first half of the 2006–07 season.

Charlton Athletic
During the January 2007 transfer window, Bougherra was linked with several Premier League clubs. Sheffield Wednesday rejected a £1.3 million offer from Charlton Athletic, whilst Reading, Everton and Birmingham City were also rumoured to be interested. Eventually the Owls accepted an increased offer of £2.5 million from Charlton for Bougherra, who completed his move to The Valley on 28 January 2007.
Bougherra was linked with a transfer to West Brom in the summer of 2008 after a transfer fee of £2.5 million was accepted by Charlton. However, Bougherra chose not to join Albion, saying that the absence of West Brom chairman Jeremy Peace during negotiations was a major factor; Peace commented that his presence was not required for the transfer to go through.

Rangers
Bougherra joined Rangers, signing a four-year contract for £2.5 million on 31 July 2008. He made his debut on 9 August in a Scottish Premier League match against Falkirk, and scored his first goal on 28 September 2008 in a 3–0 win against Hibernian. After Rangers lost Carlos Cuéllar to Aston Villa, Bougherra formed a consistent partnership alongside David Weir. Bougherra was sent off in a 2–1 win over Aberdeen in May 2009 after a challenge with Jamie Langfield. The red card was reduced to a yellow upon appeal after the referee changed his decision after reviewing the incident. Bougherra was available for the title decider against Dundee United the following weekend which Rangers won 3–0, winning them the title. Bougherra ended his first season in Scottish football by winning the Scottish Cup in a 1–0 win over Falkirk.

On 12 September 2009, Bougherra was shown two yellows in the same minute against Motherwell at Fir Park, in doing so giving away a penalty. On 16 September 2009, he scored a solo goal in the 77th minute to make it 1–1 against VfB Stuttgart in the group stage of the 2009–10 UEFA Champions League, earning Rangers a point. The goal came on Bougherra's European debut for the club. After playing for Algeria against Rwanda in a 2010 FIFA World Cup qualifier Bougherra returned to Scotland two days late and was subsequently dropped for a league match away to St Johnstone on 17 October. He was late returning from international duty again in November after being caught up in Algeria's World Cup qualification celebrations. On 3 May 2010, Bougherra was awarded the PFA Scotland goal of the season for his effort in the 7–1 win over Dundee United in December 2009.

Bougherra missed much of the second half of the 2009–10 season through injury, but picked up his second SPL winners medal after Rangers clinched back-to-back league titles in 2010.

On 14 September 2010, Bougherra was named as the man of the match in the opening group game of the 2010–11 UEFA Champions League against Manchester United at Old Trafford, with the game ending 0–0. On 26 January 2011, he scored with a volley in a 2–0 win over Hibernian.

In March 2011, Bougherra announced that he intended to leave Rangers at the end of the 2010–11 season after turning down a new contract. Bougherra was fined £2500 by the SFA for manhandling referee Callum Murray during an Old Firm match in 2011. On 3 August in a 2011–12 UEFA Champions League qualifier against Malmö FF, Bougherra was shown a straight red card for elbowing an opponent, which proved to be his last game for the club.

Lekhwiya
In August 2011, Bougherra moved to Qatari club Lekhwiya for £1.7 million. Bougherra made his league debut on 16 September in a match against Al-Wakrah where he scored the only goal of the match, thus scoring the first goal of the 2011–12 season. In his first season with the club, he helped Lekhwiya win the 2011–12 Qatar Stars League. Bougherra left Lekhwiya in May 2014.

Aris, retirement
On 9 September 2016, Bougherra signed for Football League Greece club Aris. Three months later, after not featuring for Aris and only appearing on the bench once, Bougherra announced his retirement from football.

International career
Despite being born in France, Bougherra opted to play for Algeria, who he was eligible to represent through a grandparent. He made his debut at under-23 level on 2 January 2004, in a 2004 Summer Olympics qualifier against Ghana. He made two more appearances at under-23 level in qualifiers against Ghana and Zambia.

Bougherra made his full debut for the Algeria national team in a 2006 FIFA World Cup qualifier on 20 June 2004 against Zimbabwe. On 2 July 2007, he scored his first goal in a 2–2 draw against Cape Verde. His second goal came on 20 June 2009, a header from a free kick in the 2010 FIFA World Cup qualifier against Zambia, which ended in a 2–0 win, putting them at the top of their group.

Coaching and managerial career
In 2017, Bougherra joined the technical coaching staff of Georges Leekens at the national team of Algeria. In the summer 2017, he then became manager of Al-Duhail SC's reserve team / U23 team.

On 16 June 2019, he was appointed manager of Emirati club Fujairah FC. On 9 February 2020, he departed from his Fujairah job by a mutual consent after dropping into the relegation zone.

On 22 June 2020, the Algerian Football Federation announced the appointment of Bougherra to the position of coach of Algeria A' national team.

Career statistics

Club

International goals
Scores and results list Algeria's goal tally first, score column indicates score after each Bougherra goal.

Managerial statistics

Honours

As a player
Rangers
Scottish Premier League: 2008–09, 2009–10, 2010–11
Scottish Cup: 2008–09
Scottish League Cup: 2009–10, 2010–11

Lekhwiya
Qatar Stars League: 2011–12, 2013–14
Qatar Crown Prince Cup: 2013

Individual
PFA Scotland Team of the Year: 2008–09, 2010–11
Rangers Player of the Year: 2009
PFA Scotland Goal of the Season: 2010 
Algerian Ballon d'or: 2009, 2010 
DZFoot d'Or: 2009, 2010
El Heddaf Arab Footballer of the Year: 2009
CAF Team of the Year: 2010
Africa Cup of Nations Team of the Tournament: 2010
Algeria Press Service: Best Algerian athletes of the year: 2010

As a manager
Algeria
FIFA Arab Cup: 2021

See also

References

External links

1982 births
Living people
Sportspeople from Dijon
Footballers from Bourgogne-Franche-Comté
Algerian footballers
French footballers
Association football defenders
FC Gueugnon players
Crewe Alexandra F.C. players
Sheffield Wednesday F.C. players
Charlton Athletic F.C. players
Rangers F.C. players
Lekhwiya SC players
Fujairah FC players
Aris Thessaloniki F.C. players
Ligue 2 players
English Football League players
Premier League players
Scottish Premier League players
Qatar Stars League players
UAE Pro League players
Algeria youth international footballers
Algeria under-23 international footballers
Algeria international footballers
2010 Africa Cup of Nations players
2010 FIFA World Cup players
2014 FIFA World Cup players
2015 Africa Cup of Nations players
Algerian expatriate footballers
French expatriate footballers
Expatriate footballers in England
Expatriate footballers in Greece
Expatriate footballers in Qatar
Expatriate footballers in Scotland
Expatriate footballers in the United Arab Emirates
Algerian expatriate sportspeople in England
Algerian expatriate sportspeople in Greece
Algerian expatriate sportspeople in Qatar
Algerian expatriate sportspeople in Scotland
Algerian expatriate sportspeople in the United Arab Emirates
French expatriate sportspeople in England
French expatriate sportspeople in Greece
French expatriate sportspeople in Qatar
French expatriate sportspeople in Scotland
French expatriate sportspeople in the United Arab Emirates
Algerian football managers
French football managers
Fujairah FC managers
UAE Pro League managers
French sportspeople of Algerian descent